Fred Van Oystaeyen (born 1947), also Freddy van Oystaeyen, is a mathematician and emeritus professor of mathematics at the University of Antwerp. He has pioneered work on noncommutative geometry, in particular noncommutative algebraic geometry.

Biography 
In 1972, Fred Van Oystaeyen obtained his Ph.D. from the Vrije Universiteit of Amsterdam. In 1975 he became professor at the University of Antwerp, Department of Mathematics and Computer Science.

Van Oystaeyen has well over 200 scientific papers and several books. One of his recent books, Virtual Topology and Functor Geometry, provides an introduction to noncommutative topology.

At the occasion of his 60th birthday, a conference in his honour was held in Almería, September 18 to 22, 2007; on March 25, 2011, he received his first honorary doctorate from that same university, Universidad de Almería.
At the campus of Universidad de Almería the street "Calle Fred Van Oystaeyen" (previously "Calle los Gallardos") is named after him.
In 2019, he will receive another honorary doctorate from the Vrije Universiteit Brussel.

Books 

 Hidetoshi Marubayashi, Fred Van Oystaeyen: Prime Divisors and Noncommutative Valuation Theory, Springer, 2012, 
 Fred Van Oystaeyen: Virtual topology and functor geometry, Chapman & Hall, 2008, 
 Constantin Nastasescu, Freddy van Oystaeyen: Methods of graded rings, Lecture Notes in Mathematics 1836, Springer, February 2004, 
 Freddy van Oystaeyen: Algebraic geometry for associative algebras, M. Dekker, New York, 2000, 
 F. van Oystaeyen, A. Verschoren: Relative invariants of rings: the noncommutative theory, M. Dekker, New York, 1984, 
 F. van Oystaeyen, A. Verschoren: Relative invariants of rings: the commutative theory, M. Dekker, New York, 1983, 
 Freddy M.J. van Oystaeyen, Alain H.M.J. Verschoren: Non-commutative algebraic geometry: an introduction, Springer-Verlag, 1981, 
 F. van Oystaeyen, A. Verschoren: Reflectors and localization : application to sheaf theory, M. Dekker, New York, 1979, 
 F. van Oystaeyen: Prime spectra in non-commutative algebra, Springer-Verlag, 1975,

References

External links 
 Fred Van Oystaeyen, Universiteit Antwerpen - Academic bibliography - Research
 
 Fred Van Oystaeyen, publication list at Scientific Commons
 Fred Van Oystaeyen: On the Reality of Noncommutative Space, neverendingbooks.org

1947 births
Living people
Belgian mathematicians
Vrije Universiteit Amsterdam alumni
Academic staff of the University of Antwerp